The Pegasus VBJ is a proposed VTOL business jet concept being developed by South African start-up Pegasus Universal Aerospace. It would feature a cranked dihedral wing and an X-tail design, and use two General Electric CT7 engines to drive in-wing lift fans and rear thrust fans through integrated gearboxes, all managed by multiple redundant computer systems. Cruise speed is expected to be .

Testing has taken place using a one-eighth-scale model, demonstrating the transition from horizontal to vertical flight. Pegasus intends to start flight tests on a full-scale prototype by mid-2020.

References

External links 

Proposed aircraft
VTOL aircraft